William "Spike" Bland was a professional baseball catcher in the Negro leagues. He played with the Birmingham Black Barons in 1941.

References

Further reading
 "Colored Teams Clash Today; Hilldales, Winston-Salems in Game at Stadium". The Washington Post. July 8, 1934. p. M14.

External links
 and Seamheads 

Birmingham Black Barons players
Year of birth missing
Year of death missing
Baseball catchers